Vincenzo Ciampi (born 12 December 1967 in Avellino) is an Italian politician.

He is a member of the Five Star Movement and he served as Mayor of Avellino from July to November 2018. He resigned after a motion of no confidence and the office was held by a Special Commissioner appointed on 27 November 2018 until 2019 new elections.

See also
2018 Italian local elections
List of mayors of Avellino

References

External links
 

1967 births
Living people
Mayors of Avellino
Five Star Movement politicians